Boss Music may refer to:

 Boss Music (album), an album by rapper Crooked I
 The music that plays during boss (video gaming) battles
 Bossmusic, an independent record label